John Darrow (born Harry Simpson; 17 July 1907 – 24 February 1980) was an American actor of the late silent and early talking film eras. He is the uncle of actress Barbara Darrow.

Biography

Born in Leonia, New Jersey in 1907, Darrow began acting in theater with a stock company, right after graduating high school.  Shortly after, he would begin his film career with a featured role in the 1927 silent film, High School Hero.  After several films with featured roles, he was cast as the lead in 1931's The Lady Refuses, which co-stars Betty Compson and was directed by George Archainbaud. He would spend the next five years in leading man or featured roles, before retiring from acting in 1935. He would appear in five films that year, although four of them were produced in 1934. His final screen appearance would be in a supporting role in Annapolis Farewell.

Although he retired from acting, he did not leave the film industry and instead continued on to become a very successful agent.  From the 1930s to the early 1950s, he was in a relationship with (future) film director Charles Walters.

Filmography
(Per AFI database)

Long Pants (1927) - Minor Role
The High School Hero (1927) - Bill Merrill
Avalanche (1928) - Verde
Prep and Pep (1928) - Flash Wells
The Racket (1928) - Dave Ames 
The Argyle Case (1929) - Bruce Argyle
Girls Gone Wild (1929) - Speed Wade
Cheer Up and Smile (1930) - Tom
Hell's Angels (1930) - Karl Armstedt
Primrose Path (1931) - Buck Randall
Ten Nights in a Bar Room (1931) - Frank Slade
The Lady Refuses (1931) - Russell Courtney
Everything's Rosie (1931) - Billy Lowe
Fanny Foley Herself (1931) - Teddy
The Bargain (1931) - Roderick White
Alias Mary Smith (1932) - Robert Hayes
The Midnight Lady (1932) - Bert
Probation (1932) - Nick Jarrett
Forbidden Company (1932) - Jerry Grant
The All American (1932) - Bob King
 Maizie (1933) - Boyd Kenton
Midshipman Jack (1933) - Clark Simpson
The Big Chance (1933) - Knockout Frankie "Rocky" Morgan
The Big Race (1933) - Bob Hamilton
Strange People (1933) - Jimmy Allen
Monte Carlo Nights (1934) - Larry Sturgis
Flirtation Walk (1934) - Chase
I Like It That Way (1934) - Harry Rogers
The Curtain Falls (1934) - Allan Scorsby
I Give My Love (1934) - Alex Blair
Square Shooter (1935) - Johnny Lloyd
Symphony of Living (1935) - Richard Grieg
A Notorious Gentleman (1935) - Terry Bradford
 Eight Bells (1935) - Carl
Annapolis Farewell (1935) - Porter

References

External links

 
 

1907 births
1980 deaths
20th-century American male actors
LGBT male actors
Talent agents
American male silent film actors
American male film actors
People from Leonia, New Jersey
Male actors from New Jersey
American LGBT actors
20th-century American LGBT people